Windows 95 is a consumer-oriented operating system developed by Microsoft as part of its Windows 9x family of operating systems. The first operating system in the 9x family, it is the successor to Windows 3.1x, and was released to manufacturing on July 14, 1995, and generally to retail on August 24, 1995, almost three months after the release of Windows NT 3.51. Windows 95 merged Microsoft's formerly separate MS-DOS and Microsoft Windows products, and featured significant improvements over its predecessor, most notably in the graphical user interface (GUI) and in its simplified "plug-and-play" features. There were also major changes made to the core components of the operating system, such as moving from a mainly cooperatively multitasked 16-bit architecture to a 32-bit preemptive multitasking architecture, at least when running only 32-bit protected mode applications.

Accompanied by an extensive marketing campaign, Windows 95 introduced numerous functions and features that were featured in later Windows versions, and continue in modern variations to this day, such as the taskbar, notification area, and the "Start" button.

Three years after its introduction, Windows 95 was followed by Windows 98. Microsoft ended mainstream support for Windows 95 on December 31, 2000. Like Windows NT 3.51, Windows 95 received only one year of extended support, ending on December 31, 2001.

Development

The initial design and planning of Windows 95 can be traced back to around March 1992, just around the time before the release of Windows 3.1. At this time, Windows for Workgroups 3.11 and Windows NT 3.1 were still in development. At this point, Microsoft's strategy was to have a next generation, high-end OS based on Windows NT, namely, Cairo, and a low-end, consumer-focused one as an evolution of Windows 3.1. The latter strategy was to develop a 32-bit underlying kernel and filesystem with 32-bit protect mode device drivers in Windows for Workgroups 3.11, to be used as the basis for the next version of Windows, code named "Chicago." Cairo would be Microsoft's next-generation operating system based on Windows NT, featuring a new user interface and an object-based file system, but it was not planned to be shipped before 1994. Cairo would never be shipped, however, although elements from the Cairo project eventually shipped in Windows NT 4.0 in late July 1996, without the object-based file system, which would later evolve into WinFS.

Simultaneously with Windows 3.1's release, IBM started shipping OS/2 2.0. Microsoft realized they required an updated version of Windows that could support 32-bit applications and preemptive multitasking, but could still run on low-end hardware (Windows NT did not). Initially, the "Chicago" team did not know how the product would be packaged. Initial thoughts were there might be two products, MS-DOS 7, which would just be the underlying OS, an evolution of the Windows for Workgroups 3.11 kernel, with a character mode OS on top, and a fully integrated graphical Windows OS. But soon into the project, the idea of MS-DOS 7 was abandoned and the decision was made to develop only an integrated graphical OS Windows "Chicago."

Beta
Before Windows 95's official release, users in the United States and United Kingdom had an opportunity to participate in the Windows 95 Preview Program. For US$19.95/£19.95, users would receive several 3.5-inch floppy disks that would be used to install Windows 95 either as an upgrade from Windows 3.1x or as a fresh installation. Participants were also given a free preview of The Microsoft Network (MSN), the online service that Microsoft launched with Windows 95. During the preview period, Microsoft established various electronic distribution points for promotional and technical documentation on Chicago, including a detailed document for media reviewers describing the new system highlights. The preview versions expired in November 1995, after which the user would have to purchase their copy of the final version of Windows 95.

Architecture

Windows 95 was designed to be maximally compatible with existing MS-DOS and 16-bit Windows programs and device drivers while offering a more stable and better performing system. The Windows 95 architecture is an evolution of Windows for Workgroups' 386 enhanced mode.
Configuration Manager (CONFIGMG)Responsible for implementing Plug and Play functionality; monitoring hardware configuration changes; detecting devices using bus enumerators; and allocating I/O ports, IRQs, DMA channels and memory in a conflict-free fashion.
Installable File System Manager (Input/Output Subsystem)Coordinates access to supported file systems. Windows 95 initially shipped with support for FAT12, FAT16, the VFAT extension, ISO 9660 (CDFS), Joliet and network redirectors, with later releases supporting FAT32.

Access requests to physical media are sent to Input/Output Supervisor, a component responsible for scheduling the requests. Each physical media has its device driver: access to the disk is performed by a port driver, while access to a SCSI device is handled by a miniport driver working atop the SCSI layer. Port and Miniport drivers perform I/O operations in 32-bit protected mode, bypassing MS-DOS and BIOS, significantly improving performance. In case there is no native Windows driver for a certain storage device, or if a device is forced to run in compatibility mode, the Real Mode Mapper can access it through MS-DOS.

32-bit Windows programs are assigned their memory segments, which can be adjusted to any desired size. Memory areas outside the segment cannot be accessed by a program. If a program crashes, nothing else is harmed. Before this, programs used fixed non-exclusive 64 KB segments. While the 64 KB size was a serious handicap in DOS and Windows 3.x, lack of guarantee of exclusiveness was the cause of stability issues because programs sometimes overwrote each other's segments. A crashing Windows 3.x program could knock out surrounding processes. 

The Win32 API is implemented by three modules, each consisting of a 16-bit and a 32-bit component:

KernelProvides high-level access to memory and process management, and access to the file system. Consists of KRNL386.EXE, KERNEL32.DLL, and VWIN32.VXD.
UserResponsible for managing and drawing the various user interface components, such as windows, menus and buttons. Consists of USER.EXE and USER32.DLL.
Graphics Device Interface (GDI) Responsible for drawing graphics in a device-independent way. Consists of GDI.EXE and GDI32.DLL.

Dependence on MS-DOS

To end-users, MS-DOS appears as an underlying component of Windows 95. For example, it is possible to prevent the loading of the graphical user interface and boot the system into a real-mode MS-DOS environment. This was done by inserting command.com into the autoexec.bat file or changing the BootGUI variable in the MSDOS.SYS file to 0. This sparked debate amongst users and professionals regarding the extent to which Windows 95 is an operating system or merely a graphical shell running on top of MS-DOS.

When the graphical user interface is started, the virtual machine manager takes over the filesystem-related and disk-related functionality. MS-DOS itself is demoted to a compatibility layer for 16-bit device drivers. This contrasts with earlier versions of Windows which rely on MS-DOS to perform file and disk access (Windows for Workgroups 3.11 could also largely bypass MS-DOS when 32-bit file access and 32-bit disk access were enabled). Keeping MS-DOS in memory allows Windows 95 to use DOS device drivers when suitable Windows drivers are unavailable. Windows 95 is capable of using all 16-bit Windows 3.x drivers.

Unlike Windows 3.x, DOS programs running in Windows 95 do not need DOS drivers for the mouse, CD-ROM and sound card; Windows drivers are used instead. HIMEM.SYS is still required to boot Windows 95. EMM386 and other memory managers, however, are only used by DOS programs. In addition, CONFIG.SYS and AUTOEXEC.BAT settings (aside from HIMEM.SYS) do not affect Windows programs. DOS games, which could not be executed on Windows 3.x, can run inside Windows 95 (games tended to lock up Windows 3.x or cause other problems). As with Windows 3.x, DOS programs that use EGA or VGA graphics modes run in windowed mode (CGA and text mode programs can continue to run).

On startup, the MS-DOS component in Windows 95 responds to a pressed  key by temporarily pausing the default boot process and presenting the DOS boot options menu, allowing the user to continue starting Windows normally, start Windows in safe mode or exit to the DOS prompt. As in previous versions of MS-DOS, there is no 32-bit support and DOS drivers must be loaded for mice and other hardware.

As a consequence of DOS compatibility, Windows 95 has to keep internal DOS data structures synchronized with those of Windows 95. When starting a program, even a native 32-bit Windows program, MS-DOS momentarily executes to create a data structure known as the Program Segment Prefix. It is even possible for MS-DOS to run out of conventional memory while doing so, preventing the program from launching. Windows 3.x allocated fixed segments in conventional memory first. Since the segments were allocated as fixed, Windows could not move them, which would prevent any more programs from launching.

Microsoft partially removed support for File Control Blocks (an API hold-over of DOS 1.x and CP/M) in Windows 95 OSR2 (OEM Service Release 2). FCB functions can read FAT32 volumes, but not write to them.

User interface
Windows 95 introduced a redesigned shell based around a desktop metaphor; File shortcuts (also known as shell links) were introduced  and the desktop was re-purposed to hold shortcuts to applications, files and folders, reminiscent of Mac OS.

In Windows 3.1 the desktop was used to display icons of running applications. In Windows 95, the currently running applications were displayed as buttons on a taskbar across the bottom of the screen. The taskbar also contained a notification area used to display icons for background applications, a volume control and the current time.

The Start menu, invoked by clicking the "Start" button on the taskbar or by pressing the Windows key, was introduced as an additional means of launching applications or opening documents. While maintaining the program groups used by its predecessor Program Manager, it also displayed applications within cascading sub-menus.

The previous File Manager program was replaced by Windows Explorer and the Explorer-based Control Panel and several other special folders were added such as My Computer, Dial-Up Networking, Recycle Bin, Network Neighborhood, My Documents, Recent documents, Fonts, Printers, and My Briefcase among others. AutoRun was introduced for CD drives.

The user interface looked dramatically different from prior versions of Windows, but its design language did not have a special name like Metro, Aqua or Material Design. Internally it was called "the new shell" and later simply "the shell". The subproject within Microsoft to develop the new shell was internally known as "Stimpy".

In 1994, Microsoft designers Mark Malamud and Erik Gavriluk approached Brian Eno to compose music for the Windows 95 project. The result was the six-second start-up music-sound of the Windows 95 operating system, The Microsoft Sound and it was first released as a startup sound in May 1995 on Windows 95 May Test Release build 468.

When released for Windows 95 and Windows NT 4.0, Internet Explorer 4 came with an optional Windows Desktop Update, which modified the shell to provide several additional updates to Windows Explorer, including a Quick Launch toolbar, and new features integrated with Internet Explorer, such as Active Desktop (which allowed Internet content to be displayed directly on the desktop).

Some of the user interface elements introduced in Windows 95, such as the desktop, taskbar, Start menu and Windows Explorer file manager, remained fundamentally unchanged on future versions of Windows.

Technical improvements
Windows 95 included support for 255-character mixed-case long filenames and preemptively multitasked protected-mode 32-bit applications. 16-bit processes were still co-operatively multitasked.

Plug and Play

Windows 95 tried to automate device detection and configuration as much as possible, but could still fall back to manual settings if necessary. During the initial install process of Windows 95, it would attempt to automatically detect all devices installed in the system.

Windows 95 also introduced the Device Manager to indicate which devices were working optimally with correct drivers and configuration and to allow the user to override automatic Plug and Play-based driver installation with manual options or give a choice of several semi-automatic configurations to try to free up resources for devices that still needed manual configuration.

Long file names

32-bit File Access is necessary for the long file names feature introduced with Windows 95 through the use of the VFAT file system extension. It is available to both Windows programs and MS-DOS programs started from Windows (they have to be adapted slightly, since accessing long file names requires using larger pathname buffers and hence different system calls). Competing DOS-compatible operating systems released before Windows 95 cannot see these names. Using older versions of DOS utilities to manipulate files means that the long names are not visible and are lost if files are moved or renamed and by the copy (but not the original) if the file is copied. During a Windows 95 automatic upgrade of an older Windows 3.1 system, DOS and third-party disk utilities which can destroy long file names are identified and made unavailable. When Windows 95 is started in DOS mode, e.g. for running DOS programs, low-level access to disks is locked out. In case the need arises to depend on disk utilities that do not recognize long file names, such as the MS-DOS 6. x's defrag utility, a program called LFNBACK for backup and restoration of long file names is provided on the CD-ROM, specifically in its \ADMIN\APPTOOLS\LFNBACK directory.

32-bit
Windows 95 followed Windows for Workgroups 3.11 with its lack of support for older, 16-bit x86 processors, thus requiring an Intel 80386 (or compatible). While the OS kernel is 32-bit, much code (especially for the user interface) remained 16-bit for performance reasons as well as development time constraints. This had a rather detrimental effect on system stability and led to frequent application crashes.

The introduction of 32-bit file access in Windows for Workgroups 3.11 meant that 16-bit real mode MS-DOS is not used for managing the files while Windows is running, and the earlier introduction of the 32-bit disk access means that the PC BIOS is often no longer used for managing hard disks. DOS can be used for running old-style drivers for compatibility, but Microsoft discourages using them, as this prevents proper multitasking and impairs system stability. Control Panel allows a user to see which MS-DOS components are used by the system; optimal performance is achieved when they are bypassed. The Windows kernel uses MS-DOS style real-mode drivers in Safe Mode, which exists to allow a user to fix problems relating to loading native, protected-mode drivers.

Core improvements in OEM Service Releases

OEM Service Releases of Windows 95 introduced support in Windows for several core new technologies which were not included in the original release of Windows 95. These include the Internet Explorer web browser, DriveSpace compression, OpenGL, DirectX, FAT32 file system support, UltraDMA mode for disk drives, Universal Serial Bus, IEEE 1394 (FireWire), and Accelerated Graphics Port.

Accessibility features
Windows 95 introduced computer accessibility features like Sticky keys, FilterKeys, ToggleKeys, Mouse keys. Microsoft Active Accessibility API was introduced as an add-on for Windows 95.

System requirements
Official system requirements were an Intel 386DX CPU of any speed, 4 MB of system RAM and 50–55 MB of hard disk space depending on features selected. These minimal claims were made in order to maximize the available market of Windows 3.1 migrations. This configuration would rely heavily on virtual memory and was only optimal for productive use on single-tasking dedicated workstations. It was possible to run Windows 95 on a 386 SX, but this led to even less acceptable performance due to its 16-bit external data bus. To achieve optimal performance, Microsoft recommended an i486 or compatible CPU with at least 8 MB of RAM.

Windows 95 may fail to boot on computers with a processor faster than 2.1 GHz and more than approximately 480 MB of memory. In such a case, reducing the file cache size or the size of video memory can help. The theoretical maximum according to Microsoft is 2 GB.

Most copies of Windows 95 were on CD-ROM, but a -inch floppy version was also available for older machines. The retail floppy disk version of Windows 95 came on 13 DMF formatted floppy disks, while OSR 2.1 doubled the floppy count to 26. Both versions exclude additional software that the CD-ROM version might have featured. Microsoft Plus! for Windows 95 was also available on floppy disks.

Upgradeability
Windows 95 was superseded by Windows 98, which also included the Windows Desktop Update and Internet Explorer 4 by default. It could still be directly upgraded by either Windows 2000 Professional or Windows Me. Office 2000 is the last version of Microsoft Office to be compatible with Windows 95. Similarly, Windows Media Player 7.0, released in June 2000, and DirectX 8.0a, released in February 2001, are the last versions of Windows Media Player and DirectX available for Windows 95, respectively.

Internet Explorer
Windows 95 originally shipped without Internet Explorer, and the default network installation did not install TCP/IP, the network protocol used on the Internet. At the release date of Windows 95, Internet Explorer 1.0 was available, but only in the Plus! add-on pack for Windows 95, which was a separate product. The Plus! pack did not reach as many retail consumers as the operating system itself (it was mainly advertised for its non-Internet-related add-ons such as themes and better disk compression) but was usually included in pre-installed (OEM) sales, and at the time of Windows 95's release, the web was being browsed mainly with a variety of early web browsers such as NCSA Mosaic and Netscape Navigator (promoted by-products such as IBox).

Windows 95 OEM Service Release 1 was the first release of Windows to include Internet Explorer (version 2.0) with the OS. While there was no uninstaller, it could be deleted easily if desired. OEM Service Release 2 included Internet Explorer 3. The installation of Internet Explorer 4 on Windows 95 (or the OSR2.5 version preinstalled on a computer) gave Windows 95 Active Desktop and browser integration into Windows Explorer, known as the Windows Desktop Update. The CD version of the last release of Windows 95, OEM Service Release 2.5 (version 4.00.950C), includes Internet Explorer 4, and installs it after Windows 95's initial setup and first boot are complete.

While only the 4.x series of the browser contained the option to install the Windows Desktop Update features, the subsequent 5.x version had the option hidden. Editing the installer's configuration file located in a temporary folder would make the feature available in the installer. Alternatively, Windows 95 and Windows NT 4.0 users could first install IE 4 with the desktop update before installing a newer version of Internet Explorer. The last version of Internet Explorer supported on Windows 95 is Internet Explorer 5.5 with SP2, which was released on July 23, 2001. Windows 95 shipped with Microsoft's dial-up online service called The Microsoft Network (MSN).

Release and promotion
The Windows 95 release included a commercial featuring The Rolling Stones' 1981 single "Start Me Up" (a reference to the Start button). It was widely reported that Microsoft paid the Rolling Stones between US$8 and US$14 million for the use of the song in the Windows 95 advertising campaign. However, Microsoft said that this was just a rumour spread by the band to increase their market value, and the company paid US$3 million. A 30-minute promotional video, labeled a "cyber sitcom," featuring Jennifer Aniston and Matthew Perry, was also released to showcase the features of Windows 95. Microsoft's US$200 million advertising campaign featured stories of people waiting in line outside stores to get a copy.

In the UK, the largest computer chain PC World received a large quantity of point-of-sale material; many branches opened at midnight to sell the first copies of the product. Copies of The Times were available for free, and Microsoft paid for 1.5 million issues (twice the daily circulation at the time).

In the United States, the Empire State Building in New York City was lit to match the colors of the Windows logo. In Canada, a  banner was hung down the side of the CN Tower in Toronto.

The release included a number of "Fun Stuff" items on the CD, including music videos of Edie Brickell's "Good Times" and Weezer's "Buddy Holly," a trailer for the 1995 film Rob Roy and the computer game Hover!

Sales were strong, with one million copies shipped worldwide in just four days. According to International Data Corporation, by the end of 1998, Windows 95 was the most used desktop OS with 57.4% of the marketshare, with its successor Windows 98 coming in second at 17.2%. Windows 95 also still sold more non-OEM copies to large customers in the month of May 1999, which analysts attributed to large companies opting to wait for the release of Windows 2000.

Editions

Several Windows 95 editions have been released. Only the original release was sold as a shrink-wrapped product; later editions were provided only to computer OEMs for installation on new PCs. For this reason, these editions are known as OEM Service Releases (OSR).

Together with the introduction of Windows 95, Microsoft released the Microsoft Plus! for Windows 95 pack, which contained several optional components for high-end multimedia PCs, including Internet Explorer, DriveSpace and additional themes.

The first service pack was made available half a year after the original release and fixed several small bugs.

The second service pack mainly introduced support for new hardware, most notably support for hard drives larger than 2 GB in the form of the FAT32 file system. This release was never made available to end-users directly and was only sold through OEMs with the purchase of a new PC. 

A full third service pack was never released, but two smaller updates to the second were released in the form of a USB Supplement (OSR 2.1) and the Windows Desktop Update (OSR 2.5). Both were available as stand-alone updates and as updated disc images shipped by OEMs. OSR 2.5 was notable for featuring several changes to the Windows Explorer, integrating it with Internet Explorer 4.0—this version of Internet Explorer looks very similar to the one featured in Windows 98.

Legacy
On December 31, 2001, Microsoft ended its support for Windows 95, making it an "obsolete" product per the Microsoft Lifecycle Policy.

Many features have since become key components of the Microsoft Windows series, such as the Start menu and the taskbar, originated in Windows 95. Neil MacDonald, a Gartner analyst, said that Windows 95 "was a quantum leap in difference in technological capability and stability." Ina Fried of CNET said that "by the time Windows 95 was finally ushered off the market in 2001, it had become a fixture on computer desktops around the world."

Even though support for Windows 95 has ended, the software has occasionally remained in use on legacy systems for various purposes. In addition, some video game enthusiasts choose to use Windows 95 for their legacy system to play old DOS games, although some other versions of Windows such as Windows 98 can also be used for this purpose.

Windows 95 was implemented into a web-based DOSBox emulator around early 2016.

See also

 Windows 9x

References

Further reading

Microsoft:
 
 
 
 
 
 

Third-party:
 
 
 
 
 
 

 
1995 software
Products and services discontinued in 2001
DOS variants
95
IA-32 operating systems
Products introduced in 1995